Millennial Rites is an original novel written by Craig Hinton and based on the long-running British science fiction television series Doctor Who. It features the Sixth Doctor and Mel.

Plot
The Doctor and Mel land in London, 1999, to celebrate the New Year. But other forces are making deadlier preparations to ring in the new millennium: a software firm is about to run a program that will change the very fabric of reality, while an ancient entity from the universe's origins is due for resurrection. When Anne Travers' fear of the Great Intelligence, and millionaire Ashley Chapel's research combine, London is set to be transformed into a terrifying place inhabited by unimaginable dangers.

Outside references
The first half of the novel was based on Craig's time working at IBM's Warwick Software Development Lab.

A blast of psychic energy released in the novel is felt all across the globe by those attuned to such things. These include "a thoughtful man levitating in a voluminous blue cloak" in New York and "a blond-haired man in a dirty beige trenchcoat" drinking Guinness in a Dublin pub. The book makes reference to The Library of St. John the Beheaded created by Andy Lane, who had attended the same university as Craig Hinton.

References

1995 British novels
1995 science fiction novels
Virgin Missing Adventures
Sixth Doctor novels
Novels by Craig Hinton
Fiction featuring the turn of the third millennium